The 1902 Knox Old Siwash football team was an American football team that represented Knox College in the 1902 college football season.  Knox compiled an impressive 9–2 record, shutting out seven opponents, and outscoring them 236 to 22.

Schedule

References

Knox
Knox Prairie Fire football seasons
Knox football